Tl'azt'en Nation is a First Nations band located along the north shore of Stuart Lake near the outlet of the Tache River, in the northern interior of British Columbia. The main village belonging to Tl'azt'en Nation is Tache (often spelled Tachie in English), 60 km north-west of Fort St. James.The small settlements of Middle River (Dzit'lain'li).on Trembleur Lake and Grand Rapids, along the Tache River between Stuart Lake and Trembleur Lake also belong to Tl'azt'en Nation. The main administrative offices are in Tache, as a school - Eugene Joseph Elementary School, Daycare, Head Start, Health Unit, Education Centre/ Learning Centre for Adults, RCMP/ Justice Office, Public Works building that supplies diesel and gasoline, water treatment plant, a newly built youth recreation center (2012), a Catholic and Christian church, one in Old Tache and one in "sunny side", a volunteer fire department with a fire hall; rec sites include a paintball park, a basketball court and a hockey rink. The village of Portage (in Carrier Yekooche) once belonged to Tla'zt'en Nation but separated in 1994 as Yekooche First Nation. The village of Pinchie once belonged to Tl'azt'en Nation separated on March 12, 2019 and is now the Binche Whut'en First Nation.
Prior to 1988 Tl'azt'en Nation was known as the Stuart-Trembleur band. Tl'azt'en Nation belongs to the Carrier Sekani Tribal Council.

The people of Tl'azt'en Nation are called Dakelh (pronounced ) in their own language, Carrier in English. Tl'azt'en means "people at the edge of the bay" in the Dakelh language.
Approximately 1,700 people are members of Tl'azt'en Nation. Of these, roughly 900 live off reserve.

Tl'azt'en Nation owns a not-for-profit company Tanizul Timber Ltd which manages the Tree Farm License 42 for the Nation. In November 2009, the company surrendered this Tree Farm License and entered into a Community Forest Agreement with the Province of British Columbia November 2009.  It also manages the John Prince Research Forest jointly with the University of Northern British Columbia under Chuzgun Resources Ltd.

Prominent members

Russell Alec

References

External links
Tl'azt'en Nation
Band Profile
Band Profile
History of Yekooche
Tl'azt'en Backgrounder
Tree Farm License 42
John Prince Research Forest

Dakelh governments
Omineca Country